Tristaniopsis lucida is a species of plant in the family Myrtaceae. It is endemic to New Caledonia.

References

Endemic flora of New Caledonia
lucida
Conservation dependent plants
Taxonomy articles created by Polbot
Taxa named by John Dawson (botanist)